My Brother's Keeper is a 1948 British crime film in the form of a convicts-on-the-run chase thriller, directed by Alfred Roome for Gainsborough Pictures.  It was the first of only two films directed by Roome (the other being the following year's comedy It's Not Cricket) during a long career as a film editor.  The film stars Jack Warner and George Cole and was produced by Sydney Box.

The title is taken from the story of Cain and Abel in the King James Bible: "Am I my brother's keeper?"

Plot
Handcuffed together, George Martin (Jack Warner) and Willie Stannard (George Cole) are two prisoners being transported to prison.  Martin is a hardened, cynical career criminal, while Stannard is a naïve, rather dull-witted youth who has never previously been in trouble with the law, maintains his innocence of the rape for which he has been accused and is terrified by the prospect of prison.  During the journey the pair manage to escape.  Martin steals an army corporal's uniform and passes Stannard off as a deserter in his charge, being returned to face a military tribunal. In this manner, it cleverly  explains why they are handcuffed together.

The escape location has been chosen by Martin for its proximity to a garage run by his mistress Nora Lawrence (Jane Hylton), who provides the pair with overnight shelter.  The following day Martin and Stannard take refuge in a derelict isolated cottage.  While trying to file their handcuffs apart they are surprised by a hunting man with a gun.  A struggle ensues, during which Martin strikes and kills the man.  Shortly thereafter they manage to separate the handcuffs and Martin abandons Stannard, going on the run alone while Stannard gives himself up and is promptly charged with murder.

Martin manages to contact his wife in London, asking if she can find a way to get money to him.  She arranges to travel in a taxi driven by a friend of hers to the locality where he is hiding and to leave clothes and money for him at the barber's shop.  Just as she arrives, the police have tracked Martin down and have him cornered, halting her progress.  Rather than give himself up, Martin makes a final doomed attempt to escape through a warning-signed minefield, watched by police, reporters, his wife and mistress and a crowd of sensation-seeking gawkers.

Cast
 Jack Warner as George Martin
 Jane Hylton as Nora Lawrence
 David Tomlinson as Ronnie Waring
 George Cole as Willie Stannard
 Yvonne Owen as Meg Waring
 Raymond Lovell as Bill Wainwright
 Bill Owen as Syd Evans
 Brenda Bruce as Winnie Foreman
 Susan Shaw as Beryl
 Beatrice Varley as Jenny Martin
 Garry Marsh as Brewster
 Maurice Denham as Superintendent Trent
 Frederick Piper as Gordon
 Wilfrid Hyde-White as Harding
 John Boxer as Police Sergeant Bert Foreman 
 Amy Veness as Mrs. Gully 
 Fred Groves as Crown Hotel landlord 
 Arthur Hambling as Edward Hodges 
 Valentine Dyall as Inspector at Milton Wells 
 George Merritt as Constable at Milton Wells 
 Jack Raine as Chief Constable Col. Heatherly
 Ben Williams as Policeman at Nora's Garage
 Christopher Lee as Second Constable

Production
The film was originally known as Double Pursuit. It was produced by Sydney Box who had just taken over as head of production at Gainsborough Studios and was keen to develop new talent via lowered budgeted movies. The film was based on a story by journalist Maurice Wiltshire, his first for the movies; it was the first screenplay for Frank Harvey, first credit as full producer for Anthony Yarnborough, first film for Alfred Roome, first film for the editor and cinematographer, and first starring role for George Cole.

Filming started in December 1947. Gainsborough had meant to make another movie that month called Roses Her Pillow, but production on that was postponed when Margaret Lockwood refused to star and Sydney Box could not find anyone he felt was suitable to replace her, so brought forward Double Pursuit on the studio's schedule. The original stars announced were Jack Warner, John McCallum and Peter Hammond. McCallum and Hammond did not appear in the final movie.

The film  was shot in 45 days, nine ahead of schedule and £20,000 under budget.

My Brother's Keeper'''s exterior location sequences were filmed in the Buckinghamshire/Oxfordshire border area, including scenes shot at the now abandoned Aston Rowant railway station.

Several people who worked on the film were rewarded with long-term contracts at Gainsborough.

ReceptionMy Brother's Keeper is a well-regarded film, with a reputation as a tight, tense and fast-moving thriller with Roome's previous editing experience being well utilised.  The characterisation of the two main protagonists is praised for going deeper than the stereotypes of the tough, reckless criminal and the dim, hapless innocent.  Via the 1950 film The Blue Lamp, and Dixon of Dock Green, the TV series developed from it which ran until the mid-1970s, Warner became forever engrained on the British consciousness as George "Evenin' all" Dixon, the avuncular upholder of law and order.  My Brother's Keeper is often cited as an example of the dramatic range of which Warner was capable, before he became typecast.  Cole's performance too is credited as one of the factors in his unusually smooth transition from child star to adult actor.  The film's main weakness is cited as the interpolation of a pseudo-comic and largely irrelevant subplot involving a newspaper reporter trying to cover the story while on honeymoon in the area; although this 'framing device' could also be likened to the 'comic relief' interludes found in Shakespearian – and other – tragedies which somehow both enhance and make bearable the serious 'meat' of the drama.

Box Office
The film recorded a loss of £9,400.

See also
 The Defiant OnesReferences

 External links 
 
 
 
My Brother's Keeper at BFI
 
Review of film at Variety''

1948 films
1948 crime films
British crime films
Gainsborough Pictures films
British black-and-white films
Films set in London
Films set in England
Films directed by Alfred Roome
Films scored by Clifton Parker
1940s chase films
1948 directorial debut films
1940s English-language films
1940s British films